Molytinae is a subfamily of weevils described by Carl Johan Schönherr in 1823.

Molytinae includes the following tribes:

 Amalactini
 Aminyopini
 Amorphocerini
 Anchonini
 Cholini
 Cleogonini
 Conotrachelini
 Cycloterini
 Dinomorphini
 Euderini
 Galloisiini
 Guioperini
 Hylobiini
 Ithyporini
 Juanorhinini
 Lepyrini
 Lithinini
 Lymantini
 Mecysolobini
 Metatygini
 Molytini
 Nettarhinini
 Pacholenini
 Paipalesomini
 Petalochilini
 Phoenicobatini
 Phrynixini
 Pissodini
 Sternechini
 Styanacini
 Thalasselephantini
 Trachodini
 Trigonocolini
 Trypetidini

In many older treatments, the Bagoinae, Cryptorhynchinae, Hyperinae, Lixinae and Mesoptiliinae are included in the Molytinae as "tribus groups", as well as the Itini which are otherwise considered a tribe of the Curculioninae.

These genera, among others, belong to the subfamily Molytinae:

 Adexius
 Alloplinthus
 Anchonidium
 Anchonus
 Anisorhynchus
 Aparopion
 Baezia
 Caecossonus
 Chalcodermus
 Cholus
 Conotrachelus
 Demyrsus
 Dioptrophorus
 Echinosomidia
 Emphyastes
 Epacalles
 Eudociminus
 Gastrotaphrus
 Gononotus
 Heilipus
 Heilus
 Hilipinus
 Hoplopteridius
 Hormops
 Hylobius
 Hyperomorphus
 Iberoplinthus
 Leiosoma
 Lepilius
 Lepyrus
 Liparus
 Lymantes
 Lyperobius
 Micralcinus
 Microhyus
 Micromastus
 Minyops
 Mitoplinthus
 Nanus
 Neoerethistes
 Neoplinthus
 Oromia
 Pachylobius
 Palaeocorynus
 Pheloconus
 Pissodes
 Plinthus
 Pseudechinosoma
 Rhyssomatus
 Steremnius
 Sternechus
 Sthereus
 Styphloderes
 Thalasselephas
 Trachodes
 Tranes

Notes

External links

 
Insect vectors of plant pathogens